The field archery competition at the 2013 World Games was held from July 25 to August 1 in Cali, Colombia.

The compound competition, which took the format of a fixed distance outdoor Olympic-style knockout, took place from 25 July to 28 July, with the preliminary rounds at De La Caña Park and the finals at the Mundalista Roller Skating stadium. The recurve and barebow field archery competitions took place in the San Antonio Hills Park from 29 July to 1 August. Qualification took place over two rounds, involving first 24 unmarked targets, then 24 marked targets ranging from 5–60 metres. The top four qualifiers then competed head to head in semi-finals and finals over four different targets.

Medal summary

Medal table

Compound

Recurve

Barebow

External links

 Archery schedule
 Games schedule
 Official results

2013 World Games
Field archery at the World Games
2013 in archery